The Manlobi Mountains is a mountain range in the Sipaliwini District of Suriname. It is named after the Ndyuka village of Manlobi.

Mountain ranges of Suriname